Rock Believer is the nineteenth studio album by German rock band Scorpions, released on 22 February 2022 in the United Kingdom and 25 February elsewhere. This is the band's first studio album with drummer Mikkey Dee, who replaced James Kottak in 2016, and their first studio album in seven years since Return to Forever (2015), making it their longest gap between studio albums.

Background and production
Scorpions toured for over a year in support of Return to Forever, where the band celebrated its 50th anniversary, and about three months before the album's tour cycle ended in December 2016, drummer James Kottak was fired from the band and Mikkey Dee was officially announced as his replacement. Scorpions toured for another three years, and a follow-up album from the band was uncertain, until August 2018 when guitarist Rudolf Schenker expressed interest in recording another album, telling the Digital Journal: "We are still waiting for a moment for inspiration to do another album, like Judas Priest and Metallica did. You have to wait until the time is right." In May 2019, frontman Klaus Meine hinted that "there might be a new album out in 2020."

Progress on Rock Believer had slowly been taking shape for nearly three years, with the writing sessions commencing as early as early-to-mid 2019, and the recording sessions beginning in July 2020 at Peppermint Park Studios in Hanover and wrapping up around the following summer/fall. The sessions were supposed to take place in Los Angeles, but the COVID-19 pandemic meant that the band would record the album remotely in Germany, with producer Greg Fidelman participating via Zoom. In a March 2021 interview with Robb Flynn of Machine Head, however, Dee revealed that Scorpions were forced to scrap plans to work with Fidelman because of the pandemic. Five months later, Scorpions posted a video on Facebook from the studio where they rehearsed an as-yet-untitled song for an upcoming tour.

On 29 September 2021, the band announced the release of Rock Believer with the first single "Peacemaker", which was released on 4 November, as well as a world tour, scheduled to begin with nine consecutive concerts in March 2022 in Las Vegas, Nevada.

Critical reception

Rock Believer has received mostly positive reviews. Jason Roche of Blabbermouth.net wrote that, with this album, "The rock icons revisit many of the sounds that fueled their superstardom's peak. The level of energy and songcraft present though keep those tracks from feeling tired, and perhaps for the first time in several records, there are even a few anthems that hold up next to the classics we've been re-purchasing on multiple formats over the decades." Roche also referred to it as a "testament to the band's self-confidence that on the fiftieth anniversary of their 1972 debut album, Lonesome Crow, the band's course of action was to simply do the things that they have always done best throughout their existence", and concluded that "Rock Believer serves as a comforting reminder that Scorpions are still capable of generating catchy rock anthems in their later years."

About Rock Believer, John Aizlewood of Classic Rock wrote, "The days of unashamed ballads such as 'Wind of Change', pop-metal ('Is There Anybody There?') and bold experiments ('The Zoo') are long gone. Instead, bar two versions of the majestic, lighters-aloft 'When You Know (Where You Come From)', they've gone full throttle with an intensity that would wind their grandchildren."

Track listing

Personnel

Scorpions
 Klaus Meine – lead vocals
 Rudolf Schenker – rhythm guitar, backing vocals, guitar solo on "When You Know (Where You Come From)", guitar arrangements
 Matthias Jabs – lead guitar, rhythm guitar, acoustic guitar, slide guitar, guitar arrangements
 Paweł Mąciwoda – bass
 Mikkey Dee – drums

Additional personnel
 Ingo Powitzer – additional guitars and bass, guitar solo on "When Tomorrow Comes", additional background vocals, claps, guitar arrangements, guitar tech
 Jakob Himmelein – additional background vocals, claps, recording assistant
 Alex Malek – additional background vocals, claps
 Pitti Hecht – percussion

Technical
 Scorpions – production
 Hans-Martin Buff – production, recording, programming, sound design, additional background vocals, claps 
 Michael Ilbert – mixing
 Tom Porcell Woznik – mastering
 Peter Kirkman – guitar tech
 Matthias Liebetruth – drum tech
 René Thomsen – drum tech
 Rocket and Wink – design, artwork
 Jeff Thrower – cover-photo
 Marc Theis – backcover-photo
 Klaus Voormann – coverdesign

Charts

Weekly charts

Year-end charts

References

2022 albums
Scorpions (band) albums
Vertigo Records albums